A Cold Summer is a 2003 Australian film. The writing of the film was highly collaborative with input from all the actors.

Plot
Bobby, who is living in a car having left his wife, begins a charged sexual relationship with the married Tia. Tia renews a friendship with Phaedra, who has lost a boyfriend to heroin.

Cast
Teo Gilbert as Bobby
Olivia Pigeot as Tia
Susan Prior as Phaedra

Production
It was the second feature film from Paul Middleditch, who was one of the leading TV commercial directors in Australia.

Director Paul Middleditch lived with the three main actors for a number of months working on the screenplay.  "I wanted to create a work that was a direct response to the emotional state I was in at the time", he says. "I wanted to construct three truthful portraits of people dealing with death in their lives in radically different ways and to create an environment in which they could expose their real lives before the camera".

The film was shot over five days.

Release
The film screened at the Sydney Film Festival and the Melbourne International Film Festival.

References

External links

Review of film at Variety
Interview with Paul Middleditch at SBS Movie Show
Review of film at Film Critic
Review of film at ABC Radio
Review of film at Real Time
Collected articles on film at Murdoch University
A Cold Summer at Screen Australia
A Cold Summer at BFI

Australian drama films
2003 films
2000s English-language films
2003 drama films
2000s Australian films